José Pelletier (30 August 1888 – 14 February 1970) was a French racing cyclist. He rode in four editions of the Tour de France and won the 1920 Volta a Catalunya.

Major results

1913
 5th Paris–Bourges
1919
 1st Overall Volta a Tarragona
1st Stages 3 & 4
1920
 1st  Overall Volta a Catalunya
1st Stages 1a, 1b, 2 & 3
1921
 1st Overall Marseille–Lyon
1922
 1st Overall Marseille–Lyon
1st Stages 1a, 1b, 2 & 3
1923
 1st Tour du Vaucluse
 1st Paris–Chauny
 2nd Overall Volta a Catalunya
1st Stage 3
1924
 1st Circuit des Monts du Roannais
 2nd Paris-Nancy
1926
 1st Overall Tour du Sud-Est
1st Stage 4

References

1888 births
1970 deaths
French male cyclists